The R391 road is a regional road in Ireland linking Clara, County Offaly to Mullingar, County Westmeath. It passes through the villages of Horseleap and Dysart and several hamlets before terminating west of Mullingar.

See also
Roads in Ireland
National primary road
National secondary road

References
Roads Act 1993 (Classification of Regional Roads) Order 2006 – Department of Transport

Regional roads in the Republic of Ireland
Roads in County Westmeath
Roads in County Offaly